webOS, also known as LG webOS and previously known as Open webOS, HP webOS and Palm webOS, is a Linux kernel-based multitasking operating system for smart devices such as smart TVs that has also been used as a mobile operating system. Initially developed by Palm, Inc. (which was acquired by Hewlett-Packard), HP made the platform open source, at which point it became Open webOS.

The operating system was later sold to LG Electronics, and was made primarily a smart TV operating system for LG televisions as a successor to LG Netcast. In January 2014, Qualcomm announced that it had acquired technology patents from HP, which included all the webOS and Palm patents; LG licenses them to use in their devices.

Various versions of webOS have been featured on several devices since launching in 2009, including Pre, Pixi, and Veer smartphones, TouchPad tablet, LG's smart TVs since 2014, LG's smart refrigerators and smart projectors since 2017.

History

2009–2010: Launch by Palm
Palm launched webOS, then called Palm webOS, in January 2009 as the successor to Palm OS. The first webOS device was the original Palm Pre, released by Sprint in June 2009. The Palm Pixi followed. Upgraded "Plus" versions of both Pre and Pixi were released on Verizon and AT&T.

2010–2013: Acquisition by HP; the launch of Open webOS
In April 2010, HP acquired Palm.  The acquisition of Palm was initiated while Mark Hurd was CEO, however he resigned shortly after the acquisition was completed. Later, webOS was described by new HP CEO Leo Apotheker as a key asset and motivation for the purchase. The $1.2 billion acquisition finalized in June. HP indicated its intention to develop the webOS platform for use in multiple new products, including smartphones, tablets, and printers.

In February 2011, HP announced that it would use webOS as the universal platform for all its devices. However, HP also made the decision that the Palm Pre, Palm Pixi, and the "Plus" revisions would not receive over-the-air updates to webOS 2.0, despite a previous commitment to an upgrade "in coming months." HP announced several webOS devices, including the HP Veer and HP Pre 3 smartphones, running webOS 2.2, and the HP TouchPad, a tablet computer released in July 2011 that runs webOS 3.0.

In March 2011, HP announced plans for a version of webOS by the end of 2011 to run within Windows, and to be installed on all HP desktop and notebook computers in 2012. Neither ever materialized, although work had begun on an x86 port around this time involving a team in Fort Collins, Colorado; work was scrapped later in the year.

In August 2011, HP announced that it was interested in selling its Personal Systems Group, responsible for all of its consumer PC products, including webOS, and that webOS device development and production lines would be halted. It remained unclear whether HP would consider licensing webOS software to other manufacturers. When HP reduced the price of the Touchpad to $99, the existing inventory quickly sold out.

The HP Pre 3 was launched in select areas of Europe, and US-based units were available only through unofficial channels (both AT&T and Verizon canceled their orders just prior to delivery after Apotheker's (HP's CEO at the time) announcement. Notably, these US Pre 3 units, having been released through unofficial channels, lacked both warranties and carried no support obligation from HP; as a result parts are nearly impossible to come by. HP announced that it would continue to issue updates for the HP Veer and HP TouchPad, but these updates have failed to materialize for the former, and the latter saw a final, unofficial release called "webOS CE" that contained only open-sourced components of webOS meant for what remained of the developer community rather than a conventional, user-centric update to the operating system. The last HP webOS version, 3.0.5, was released on January 12, 2012.

In December 2011, after abandoning the TouchPad and the proposed sale of the HP Personal Systems Group, HP announced it would release webOS source code in the near future under an open-source license. In August 2012, code specific to the existing devices was released as webOS Community Edition (CE), with support for the existing HP hardware. Open webOS includes open source libraries designed to target a wider range of hardware. HP renamed its webOS unit as "Gram".

In February 2012, HP released Isis, a new web browser for Open webOS.

Growth and decline of HP App Catalog
The HP App Catalog was an app store for apps for the mobile devices running webOS.

On June 6, 2009, webOS launched on the Palm Pre with 18 available apps. The number of apps grew to 30 by June 17, 2009, with 1 million cumulative downloads by June 27, 2009; 30 official and 31 unofficial apps by July 13, 2009; 1,000 official apps by January 1, 2010; 4,000 official apps September 29, 2010; and 10,002 official apps on December 9, 2011.

Subsequently, the number of available apps decreased because many apps were withdrawn from the App Catalog by their owners. Examples include the apps for The New York Times and Pandora Radio. After a Catalog splash screen on November 11, 2014 announcing its deprecation, the HP App Catalog servers were permanently shut down on March 15, 2015. The number of functional apps remaining at that time is unknown but was probably much lower due to the imminent abandonment of the project.

2013–present: Acquisition by LG; open-source edition launch 
On February 25, 2013, HP announced that it was selling webOS to LG Electronics for use on its web-enabled smart TVs, replacing its previous NetCast platform. Under the agreement LG Electronics owns the documentation, source code, developers and all related websites. However, HP would still hold on to patents from Palm as well as cloud-based services such as the App Catalog. In 2014, HP sold its webOS patents to Qualcomm.

As well as its use as an OS for smart TVs, LG has expanded its use to various Internet of things devices. As a starting point, LG showcased a LG Wearable Platform OS (webOS) smartwatch in early 2015. 
At CES 2017, LG announced a smart refrigerator with webOS.

On March 19, 2018, LG announced an open-source edition of webOS. This edition would allow developers to download the source code for free as well as take advantage of related tools, guides, and forums on its new open source website to become more familiar with webOS and its inherent benefits as a smart device's platform. LG hopes that this will help its goal of advancing its philosophy of open platform, open partnership and open connectivity.

Features
The webOS mobile platform introduced some innovative features, such as the cards interface or the gesture navigation, that are still in use by Apple, Microsoft and Google on their mobile operating systems iOS, Windows Phone, and Android, respectively.

HP/Palm webOS

Multitasking interface
Navigation uses multi-touch gestures on the touchscreen. The interface uses "cards" to manage multitasking and represent apps. The user switches between running apps with a flick from left and right on the screen. Apps are closed by flicking a "card" up—and "off"—the screen. The app "cards" can be rearranged for organization. webOS 2.0 introduced 'stacks', where related cards could be "stacked" together.

Synergy
Palm referred to integration of information from many sources as "Synergy." Users can sign into multiple email accounts from different providers and integrate all of these sources into a single list. Similar capabilities pull together calendars and also instant messages and SMS text messages from multiple sources.

Over-the-air updates
The OS can be updated without docking to a PC, instead receiving OS updates over the carrier connection.

Notifications
The notification area is located on the bottom portion of the screen on phones, and on the top status bar area on tablets.

On phones, when a notification comes in, it slides in from the bottom of the screen. Due to the resizable nature of the Mojo and Enyo application frameworks, the app usually resizes itself to allow unhindered use while the notification is displayed. After the notification slides away, it usually remains as an icon. The user can then tap on the icons to expand them. Notifications can then be dismissed (sliding off the screen), acted upon (tapping), or left alone.

Sync
By default, data sync uses a cloud-based approach rather than using a desktop sync client. The first version of webOS shipped with the ability to sync with Apple's iTunes software by masquerading as an Apple device, but this feature was disabled by subsequent iTunes software updates.

Third-party applications
On HP webOS, officially vetted third-party apps are accessible to be installed on the device from the HP App Catalog.

As HP webOS replaced Palm OS, Palm commissioned MotionApps to code and develop an emulator called Classic, to enable backward compatibility to Palm OS apps. This operates with webOS version 1.0. Palm OS emulation was discontinued in WebOS version 2.0. MotionApps disengaged from Classic in 2010, citing HP Palm as "disruptive."

Another source of applications is homebrew software. Homebrew apps are not directly supported by HP. Programs used to distribute homebrew webOS apps include webOS Quick Install (Java-based sideloader for desktop computers) and Preware (a homebrew webOS app catalog, which must be sideloaded). If software problems do occur after installing homebrew programs, "webOS Doctor" (provided by HP) can restore a phone back to factory settings and remove changes made by homebrew apps and patches.

Developer Mode
Developer mode allows for developer access of the device, and is also used for digital forensic investigations. It can be accessed by typing webos20090606 on the device’s keyboard, or on some devices typing upupdowndownleftrightleftrightbastart (a reference to the Konami code) on the cards view. Once in developer mode, data on the system partition can be accessed freely, even if the device was locked.

LG webOS

Smart TV features
LG has redesigned the UI of webOS, maintaining the card UI as a feature called "Simple switching" between open TV apps. The other two features promoted by the company are a simple connection (using an animated Clippy-like character called Beanbird to aid the user through setup), and simple discovery.

Platform

Underneath the graphical user interface, webOS has much in common with mainstream Linux distributions. Versions 1.0 to 2.1 use a patched Linux 2.6.24 kernel.

The list of open-source components used by the different releases of webOS, as well as the source code of and patches applied to each component, is available at the Palm Open Source webpage. This page also serves as a reference listing of the versions of webOS that have been publicly released.

In 2011, Enyo replaced Mojo, released in June 2009, as the software development kit (SDK).

Hardware

See also

 List of smart TV platforms and middleware software
 Enyo
 Mobile platform
 Access Linux Platform
 LuneOS
 List of WebOS devices

References

External links

webOS Open Source Edition (LG)
LG Software Solutions
webOS Developer Center
LG webOS TV Developer Center
webOS Auto Developer Center
webOS Internals Wiki 

 
2009 software
ARM operating systems
HP software
LG Electronics
Mobile Linux
Mobile operating systems
Palm, Inc.
Smart TV
Smartphone operating systems
Software based on WebKit
Tablet operating systems